Micrarctia is a tiger moth genus in the family Erebidae described by Seitz in 1910. The genus currently contains two species. Both species are found in central to western China, including the Chinese provinces of Qinghai and Sichuan.

Taxonomy
In the 20th century, this genus name was used for many small tiger moths from different subtribes, which were later separated into their own genera: Palearctia, Sibirarctia, Sinoarctia, Lithosarctia, Sinowatsonia.

Species
Micrarctia trigona (Leech, 1899)
Micrarctia kautti Saldaitis & Pekarsky, 2015

References

Arctiina
Monotypic moth genera
Moths of Asia